Vanike Tarar  is a town in the Hafizabad District of Punjab, Pakistan.

References
Notes

External links
 District of Hafizabad - Official Site
 Local Govt. department of Punj\b - District of Hafizabad

Hafizabad District
Populated places in Hafizabad District

gl:Soianwla
hi:खैरपुर
simple:Soianwala